Veivers is a surname. Notable people with the surname include:

Greg Veivers (born 1949), Australian rugby league player
Josh Veivers, English rugby league player
Mick Veivers (born 1939), Australian rugby league player and politician
Phil Veivers (born 1964), Australian rugby league player and coach
Tom Veivers (born 1937), Australian cricketer and politician

Veivers family